For the 2001 Vuelta a España, the field consisted of 189 riders; 139 finished the race.

By rider

By nationality

References

2001 Vuelta a España
2001